The College Widow is a 1915 silent film starring Ethel Clayton. It's the first filming of George Ade's 1904 campus comedy play of the same name performed on Broadway that year. The film was made by the Lubin Company in Pennsylvania and is now lost.

Later films of this story are The College Widow (1927), Maybe It's Love (1930) and Freshman Love (1936).

Cast
Ethel Clayton – Jane Witherspoon
George Soule Spencer – Billy Bolton
Charles Brandt – Dr. Witherspoon
Edith Ritchie – Mrs. Dalzelle
Ferdinand Tidmarsh – Jack Larrabee
Howard Missimer – Matty McGowan
Clarence Elmer – Stub Talmadge
Peter Lang – Hiram Bolton
George Clarke – Silent Murphy
Joseph Kaufman – Tom Pierson

References

External links

1915 films
American silent feature films
American films based on plays
Lost American films
American football films
1910s English-language films
1915 comedy-drama films
American black-and-white films
Lubin Manufacturing Company films
1915 lost films
Lost comedy-drama films
Silent comedy-drama films
Films directed by Barry O'Neil
1910s American films
Silent American comedy-drama films